Saluk-e Olya (also Romanized as Sālūk-e ‘Olyā; also known as Salug and Sālūk-e Bālā) is a village in Posht-e Arbaba Rural District, Alut District, Baneh County, Kurdistan Province, Iran. In 2006, its population was 247, in 42 families. The village is populated by Kurds.

References 

Towns and villages in Baneh County
Kurdish settlements in Kurdistan Province